R.I.P. is the debut album released by the Swiss thrash metal band Coroner on 1 June 1987. This album marks the first chapter of the band's progression (thus it is less focused) and is characterized by raw speed and power (save for the instrumentals), representing an early progressive blend of neoclassical metal and thrash metal.

Track listing 
All songs written and arranged by Ron Broder & Tommy Vetterli, except where noted. All lyrics written by Marky Edelmann, except where noted.

Personnel 
Coroner
Ron Broder (as Ron Royce) – vocals, bass
Tommy Vetterli (as Tommy T. Baron) – guitars
Marky Edelmann (as Marquis Marky) – drums

Production
Harris Johns – producer, engineer, mixing
M. Marky – cover design, pictures
Micha Good – skull logo
Alex Solca – band photos

Notes 
Nosferatu is a synonym for vampire and is the title of film by F.W. Murnau, though it is not known whether this film had a direct influence on Coroner.
The intro of "Totentanz" is actually a cover of a bourrée by French composer Robert de Visée (c.1650 – 1725), and was written by A.M. Siegrist.
The 12" vinyl and cassette releases by former Canadian record label Cobra Records cuts the track listing short to 8 songs, excluding "Spiral Dream" and the instrumentals and keeping only Nosferatu.
The 1993 cassette release by former Italian record label Armando Curcio Editore excludes "Spiral Dream" and the "Outro" song.

References

External links 
 THE DEATH CULT LODGE GREECE 
 BNR Metal Pages' section on Coroner
 Fan page with detailed album information and lyrics
 Coroner @ Last.fm

Coroner (band) albums
1987 debut albums
Noise Records albums
Albums produced by Harris Johns